The 2014 Texas Longhorns volleyball team represented the University of Texas in the 2014 NCAA Division I women's volleyball season. The Texas Longhorns women's volleyball team, led by 14th year head coach Jerritt Elliott, played their home games at Gregory Gymnasium. The Longhorns were members of the Big 12 and were picked to win the conference title in the preseason poll.

The Longhorns won the Big 12 Championship and advanced to the National semifinals for the third time in four years. In the national semifinal Texas fell to unseeded BYU 3–1 to end their season.

Season highlights
The Longhorns won the Lobo Challenge & the 26 West Longhorn Classic with a 6–0 record. Even more impressive, they went 18–0 in the sets. 
The Longhorns clinched the Big 12 title with 3 conference games remaining by avenging their only conference loss. 
The Longhorns were awarded the #2 overall seed in the NCAA tournament.

Roster

Schedule

Announcers for televised games
@ New Mexico: JD Healy & Gale Trip
@ Tennessee: Larry Vettel & Missy Whittemore
Arizona: Paul Sunderland & Nell Fortner
UCF: Paul Sunderland & Nell Fortner
Florida A&M: Paul Sunderland & Nell Fortner
@ Nebraska: Larry Punteney & Kathi Wieskamp
@ West Virginia: Sam Gore & Dain Blanton
Iowa State: Tyler Denning & Nell Fortner
@ Kansas: Bill Ferguson & Anne Marie Anderson
Baylor: Tyler Denning & Nell Fortner
Texas Tech: Tyler Denning & Nell Fortner
@ Kansas State: Brian Smoller & Kelsey Stringer
TCU: Tyler Denning & Nell Fortner
Oklahoma: Paul Sunderland & Nell Fortner
Zhejiang: Paul Sunderland & Nell Fortner
Zhejiang: Paul Sunderland & Nell Fortner
@ Iowa State: Sam Gore & Dain Blanton
@ Texas Tech: Robert Giovanetti & Andy Penney
Kansas State: Paul Sunderland & Nell Fortner
West Virginia: Tyler Denning & Nell Fortner
@ Oklahoma: Bruce Haertl & Laura Alford
@ Baylor: John Morris & Kristen Bates
Kansas: Paul Sunderland & Nell Fortner
@ TCU: Chuck LaMendola & Pam Lea
Florida: Paul Sunderland & Nell Fortner
Northwestern State: Paul Sunderland & Nell Fortner
Arizona State: Paul Sunderland & Nell Fortner
vs. Colorado State: Paul Sunderland & Maria Taylor
vs. North Carolina: Paul Sunderland & Maria Taylor
vs. BYU: Beth Mowins, Karch Kiraly, & Holly Rowe

References

Texas Volleyball
2014 Texas Volleyball
2014 in American sports
Sports teams in Texas
Texas